Cliffs Pavilion is a theatre and concert venue on Station Road in Westcliff-on-Sea, Essex, England, a town within the city of Southend-on-Sea. It seats 1,630 and offers an assortment of variety acts.

Building 
Work began on the original Cliffs Pavilion during the 1930s. It was intended to be a 500-seat theatre incorporating the art deco style of the times. With the outbreak of World War II, however, the building work halted. The site remained boarded-up until 1959, when the original building was leveled. It was then moved to one side and slightly closer to the edge of the cliff to form the basis of the present Cliffs Pavilion, which opened in 1964.

Re-development 
From July 1991 to December 1992, the building was closed to be re-developed and enlarged, with the funding of Southend Borough Council and designed by Tim Foster Architects. The stairs were rebuilt, a new Foyer Bar added and a balcony added to the auditorium. Since re-opening, annual audience figures increased from about 200,000 to about 340,000.

Music 
On 19 July 1991, Paul McCartney performed one of his six "secret" shows at the Pavilion during his 1991 Unplugged Summer Tour. 

The Oasis concert film Live By The Sea was fimed at the Cliffs Pavilion on 17 April 1995. 

The track "Beetlebum" from Blur's Live 2009 CD (given away free with The Sunday Times) was recorded at the Cliff's Pavillion.

References

External links
Cliffs Pavilion on Theatricalia
Cliffs Pavilion on Southend Theatres

Art Deco architecture in England
Buildings and structures completed in 1964
Buildings and structures in Southend-on-Sea
Theatres in Essex